Arab Women's Congress can refer to:

 First Arab Women's Congress, organized by the Arab Women's Executive Committee in Jerusalem in 1929
 Arab Women's Congress of 1944, also called Arab Feminist Congress, organized by the Egyptian Feminist Union in Cairo in 1944